Susan Jennifer Pearson is an American historian of the nineteenth and early twentieth century. As an associate professor at Northwestern University, she received the 2012 Merle Curti Award for her book The Rights of the Defenseless: Protecting Animals and Children in Gilded Age America. She published The Birth Certificate: An American History in 2022, with the University of North Carolina Press.

Early life
Pearson earned her Bachelor of Arts degree from Oberlin College before enrolling at the University of North Carolina at Chapel Hill for her Master's degree and PhD.

Career
Upon receiving her PhD in 2004, Pearson joined the Department of History at Northwestern University as an assistant professor. In this role, she published her first book titled The Rights of the Defenseless: Protecting Animals and Children in Gilded Age America, which received the 2012 Merle Curti Award. The book focused on the history of child and animal protective services working together in the nineteenth century to protect youth and animals from abuse. Following the publication of the book, Pearson received a yearlong National Endowment for the Humanities Fellowship for her project A History of Birth Registration in America. The project was later retitled as Registering Birth: Population and Personhood in American History and she received a Charles A. Ryskamp Research Fellowship from the American Council of Learned Societies. In 2015, she published Age Ought to Be a Fact: The Campaign against Child Labor and the Rise of the Birth Certificate, which discussed the difficulty states face when enforcing child labor laws due to lack of access to birth records. In 2022, she published The Birth Certificate: An American History (UNC Press).

Personal life
Pearson is divorced and has two children.

References

External links
 

Living people
American women historians
21st-century American historians
Northwestern University faculty
University of North Carolina at Chapel Hill alumni
Oberlin College alumni
Year of birth missing (living people)
21st-century American women